Mike Bracken  is a public sector technology leader who was a founder and executive director of the UK Government Digital Service (GDS). Under his leadership, the UK became a world leader in digital government, with the US Digital Service, the Australian Digital Transformation Office and numerous others modelling themselves on GDS, as a founder nation of the Digital 5.

Career 
Bracken was director of digital development at Guardian News & Media.
He was headhunted by the UK Government and joined the Government Digital Service in July 2011. He became chief data officer in 2014. He left GDS in September 2015.

From August 2015 until 2017 he was part-time chief digital officer at The Co-operative Group.

He is a visiting professor of practice at the UCL Institute for Innovation and Public Purpose.

Bibliography 
 Digital Transformation at Scale: Why the Strategy Is Delivery (2018, London Publishing Partnership;  / 2021, London Publishing Partnership)

See also 
 Jerry Fishenden
 Francis Maude
 Gov.uk
 GOV.UK Verify
 Martha Lane-Fox
 Mayank Prakash
 Ben Terrett

References

External links 
 

Government Digital Service
The Guardian people
Academics of University College London
The Co-operative Group
Chief digital officers
Date of birth missing (living people)
Year of birth missing (living people)
Living people
Commanders of the Order of the British Empire